The 1939 Chico State Wildcats football team represented Chico State College—now known as California State University, Chico—as a member of the Far Western Conference (FWC) during the 1939 college football season. Led by Hubert J. McCormick in his first and only season as head coach, Chico State compiled an overall record of 2–3–2 with a mark of 1–2 in conference play, placing fourth  in the FWC. The team was outscored by its opponents 47 to 28 for the season. The Wildcats played home games at College Field in Chico, California.

Schedule

Notes

References

Chico State
Chico State Wildcats football seasons
Chico State Wildcats football